Bundaberg is a city in Queensland, Australia

Bundaberg may also refer to:

Bundaberg Airport, a regional airport serving Bundaberg, and used as a Royal Australian Air Force training base during World War II
Bundaberg Base Hospital, a public hospital
Bundaberg Brewed Drinks, an Australian soft drink manufacturer
Bundaberg Central, Queensland, the suburb at the centre of Bundaberg
Bundaberg Christian College, a private school
Bundaberg East, Queensland, an eastern suburb of Bundaberg
Bundaberg Hummock, a volcano remnant
Bundaberg North, Queensland, a northern suburb of Bundaberg
Bundaberg railway station
Bundaberg Red Cup, a semi-professional rugby league competition based in New South Wales
Bundaberg Red Racing, the commercial name for the V8 Supercar Walkinshaw Racing team
Bundaberg Rum, a dark rum produced in Australia
1936 Bundaberg distillery fire
Bundaberg Rum Stadium, the former, sponsorship-derived name for Cazaly's Stadium
Bundaberg Rum Test, the sponsorship-derived name for the ANZAC Test between 2004 and 2008
Bundaberg Spirit, a team in the Queensland State League association football competition
Bundaberg South, Queensland, a southern suburb of Bundaberg
Bundaberg Regional Council, the local government area encompassing the city of Bundaberg from 2008 
Bundaberg West, Queensland, a western suburb of Bundaberg
City of Bundaberg, the local government area encompassing the city of Bundaberg from 1902 to 2008
Electoral district of Bundaberg, a state electoral district in Queensland
, two ships of the Royal Australian Navy